ZRH or ZrH may refer to:

 Zurich Airport, airport for Zürich, Switzerland, with IATA code ZRH
 ZrH, chemical symbol for zirconium hydride, an alloy of zirconium and hydrogen